The Edmonton City Hall is the home of the municipal government of Edmonton, Alberta, Canada. Designed by Dub Architects, the building was completed in 1992. It was built to replace the former city hall designed by architects Kelvin Crawford Stanley and Maxwell Dewar in 1957, which had become outdated and expensive to operate.

Design
The building features two steel and glass pyramids, one  (ground to peak), on top of a three-storey concrete structure. One pyramid provides natural light for the main atrium, the other for the council chambers. The building also features a  clock (Friendship Tower) topped with a set of 23-carillon bells. Located on the eastern edge of the financial district in Edmonton's downtown, the building is the main feature on Sir Winston Churchill Square. In the winter, the fountain is converted to a skating rink.

The design for the city hall met with some controversy when it was first announced. The original design called for the building to be topped with four cones.  The cones were meant to evoke the tipis that the First Nations once lived in on the site. The design met with negative feedback from the public as they felt it looked like dunce caps and nuclear reactors. Dub Architects then revised their design to replace the cones with the pyramids, with the pyramids designed to be evocative of the Rocky Mountains and the Muttart Conservatory.

Temporary Renaming

The building was temporarily renamed the "Nathan Fillion Civilian Pavilion" for 24 hours in August 2021, for a debut of his most recent documentary. Nathan Fillion was born in Edmonton in 1971.

Gallery

References

External links
Edmonton City Hall

 

Government buildings completed in 1992
Buildings and structures in Edmonton
Municipal government of Edmonton
City and town halls in Alberta
Tourist attractions in Edmonton
Pyramids in Canada
Clock towers in Canada